is an anime series and PlayStation 2 romantic adventure video game developed by Ruby Party and published by Koei. Both media are based on the first game in the series, Harukanaru Toki no Naka de. The PlayStation 2 game is an enhanced remake of the original game.

This page deals with the episodes from the television series.

Series overview
Twenty-six original episodes, plus eight omake endings and an animated movie have so far been produced for the Harukanaru Toki no Naka de original characters. Based loosely on the manga of the same name, the animated series follows the adventures of Motomiya Akane in Heian Kyou as she tries to help the ordinary people fight against the powerful Oni clan who seek dominance over the city once and for all. 

The series is split into vague arcs which also appear in the manga, although often in a slightly different manner. The arcs are as follows:

>Akane arriving in Kyou and her hunt for the other Hachiyou. This arc concludes at Episode Thirteen with the location of the final Hachiyou, Tachibana no Tomomasa and the successful rescue of Morimura Tenma's younger sister, Ran, from the Oni clan's clutches.

>Akane and her Hachiyou hunting for the four seals in order to regain the power of the four Gods that the Oni Clan currently have spirited away. This arc ends at the close of Episode Twenty Six and marks the end of the series proper.

Though the ending is conclusive in terms of the plot, it is not conclusive in terms of who Akane chooses in relation to the Hachiyou. In keeping with the Neoromance theme, eight endings were produced: "Eisen", "Inori", "Shimon Morimura", "Fujiwara no Takamichi", "Tenma Morimura", "Tachibana no Tomomasa", "Abe no Seimei", and "Minamoto no Yorihisa" were produced, one for each Hachiyou, and added as extra features on the final Japanese DVD release. These endings allowed viewers to choose for themselves which of the Hachiyou, if any, Akane would select to be with at the close of the story. 

Since the production of the series, a movie adaptation, has been released in Japan. This movie features the same characters and basic canon as the animated series, but cannot be seen as a sequel because during it Akane is still trying to work out to what good use she can put her Ryuujin-given powers, and the story appears to have been set during Akane's fight with the Oni clan. The film introduces the new character Oono Suefumi, who does not appear in any of the animated episodes.

Episodes
The twenty-six episode anime series has been licensed by Bandai Visual and will be released in a series of nine volumes under the title HARUKA: Beyond the Stream of Time – A Tale of the Eight Guardians.  A new volume will be released monthly with the first volume being released April 22, 2008 and the final volume due January 13, 2009.

References

External links
Neoromance official site
TV Tokyo website 
Haruhachi Koei official fansite

 J!-ENT interview with "HARUKA" director Tsunaki Aki (4/2008) By Dennis A. Amith and Michelle Tymon [j-ent]

Harukanaru Toki no Naka de Hachiyo Sho